James Francis Corbett KC*HS (1834 – 29 May 1912) was the Roman Catholic Bishop of Sale, Victoria.

Corbett was formerly stationed at St Kilda, Victoria, and was appointed first bishop of Sale in May 1887. He was consecrated at St. Mary's, St. Kilda, on 25 August. He held for a considerable period the post of Private Secretary to the late Archbishop Goold. He is a native of Limerick, and the freedom of that city was conferred upon him during a visit to Ireland in 1890.

References

1834 births
1912 deaths